Elektra is a 2010 Malayalam psychological drama film co-written and directed by Shyamaprasad, starring Nayanthara, Manisha Koirala, Prakash Raj, Biju Menon, and Skanda Ashok. It was produced by N. B. Vindhyan, who also produced Shyamaprasad's Ore Kadal.

The film is based on the story of the Greek mythological character Electra, although it has a contemporary setting in an aristocratic family in Kerala. It draws strongly on four adaptations of the myth: Electra by Sophocles, Electra by Euripides, Oresteia by Aeschylus and Mourning Becomes Electra by Eugene O’Neill (1931). Key to the film is the concept of the Electra complex; a daughter's psychosexual competition with her mother for her father's affection. A rueful journey into the bruised familial bonds of an aristocratic household in Central Kerala, the film explores desire and loss.

The film premiered at the International Film Festival of India in November 2010. It made its international premiere at the 7th Dubai International Film Festival.

Plot
Elektra (Nayantara) lives in a world torn between passion and fixation. She is so possessive of her father Abraham (Prakash Raj), that when he returns home from his plantation in Jaffna, she plans to poison his mind about his wife Diana (Manisha Koirala) having an affair with Isaac (also played by Prakash Raj).

When Abraham arrives, he is at first unaware of the impending drama. However, by the dawn of the following day, he is dead. Consumed with rage and grief, Elektra blames her mother for the death and seeks vengeance. When Elektra's brother, Edwin (Skanda Ashok) – who is plagued by an Oedipus complex – arrives for the funeral, Elektra tells him about their mother's alleged affair.

In the midst of the scandal, Elektra turns to police officer Peter (Biju Menon), who is in love with her, as a source of calm and sanity. However, Elektra and Edwin end up destroying each other, trapped by forbidden desires. Elektra is brutally victimised.

Cast
 Nayanthara as Elektra
 Manisha Koirala as Diana
 Prakash Raj as Abraham and Isaac
 Skanda Ashok as Edwin
 Biju Menon as Peter
 P. Sreekumar as Fr. Ulhannan
 KPAC Lalitha as Fr. Ulahannan's wife
 Shruthy Menon as Laura
 Pradeep Kottayam as Man in Cemetery
 Amby as Doctor

Dubbing
In Elektra for the character Issac, Prakashraj himself did the dubbing part while for the character Abraham Shobi did for him . Manisha Koirala adapted her first Malayalam movies' sound from famous actress Praveena. Nayan also gave voice to the character. Vineeth Sreenivasan gave voice for Skanda Ashok ,who played the character Edwin.

Themes

In Neo-Freudian psychology, the Electra complex, as proposed by Carl Gustav Jung, is a girl’s psychosexual competition with her mother for the possession of her father. The film's plot revolves around this concept. Like most of Shyamaprasad's films, Elektra is also female centric; there are two strong female characters. When asked if this was intentional, Shyamarasad said: 

Elektra is the darkest of all the films made by Shyamaprasad so far. The English title of the movie is Light After Dark. About the "darkness treatment" in the film, Shyamaprasad said: 

All the characters in Elektra have a negative tint to them. Shyamaprasad said:

Production

Development
The film is based on the story of the Greek mythological character Electra. Set in the city of Argos a few years after the Trojan war, that story revolves around the vengeance that Electra and her brother Orestes take on their mother Clytemnestra and step father Aegisthus for the murder of their father, Agamemnon. There are many adaptations of the story. The 2011 film is particularly inspired by the plays Electra by Sophocles, Electra by Euripides, Oresteia by Aeschylus and Mourning Becomes Electra by Eugene O’Neill.

Shyamaprasad says that Electra is a play that has stayed with him since his student days in the Thrissur School of Drama. In a December 2010 interview, he said: 

Shyamaprasad was assisted in the script writing by Kiran Prabhakar. Rather than focusing on the essence of revenge in the myth, they tried to include the theme of Elektra's obsessive love for her father. Most of Shyamaprasad's previous works were adaptations of published novels or plays. About the adaptation of Elektra, Shyamaprasad said: "My film is a modern retelling of the Greek classic in a Malayali setting. But it closely follows the philosophy of the ancient text and the Grecian theory of drama that intense fear and pity lead to a purification of the emotions of the audience, making it a cathartic experience."

Even before Ritu, Shyamaprasad's previous film, reached theatres, news about Elektra had created a buzz as Nayantara was tipped to play the lead in the movie. The film, though adapted from a Greek myth, has a contemporary setting in an aristocratic family in Kerala. The making of the film was also inspired by K. G. George's magnum opus film, Irakal.

Casting

Elektra is minimalistic in its setting and cast, with only five main characters. Nayantara plays Elektra, the lead character. She was cast after she expressed a desire to work with Shyamaprasad. Nayantara says: "I am doing this film purely for creative satisfaction, as it offers me an opportunity to showcase my histrionics skills. I am excited that I am going to explore a new genre and the director is insisting on spontaneity. So, I intend to go to the sets with an open mind." When asked the reason for entrusting such a strong role to Nayantara, Shyamaprasad said, "Everyone has this question. To be frank, after Ritu, I happened to meet Nayantara and she said she was really interested in doing movies with me. She was very keen on doing a meaningful role, something with substance. Usually she does those, you know, the glamorous, superficial roles which I guess supports her career. But she nursed the desire to do much deeper roles. Thus Elektra happened." Nayantara also gave voice to the character. Prakash Raj plays Elektra's father, and Bollywood actress Manisha Koirala plays the mother, who is also the main antagonist. The film is Koirala's debut in Malayalam cinema. About her casting, Shyamaprasad says: "At the initial stages of scripting itself, I had drawn a picture of the character in my mind and I wanted somebody very attractive yet very powerful to do the role. There was nobody I could think of other than Manisha. In terms of beauty, the inner quality of the character she identifies with and her experience in films, she was the perfect choice for me as Diana. When I approached her, she loved the script. She said she wanted to work with me and said would definitely be part of my dream project. I appreciate her move, as Malayalam as a language is really tough to learn and pronounce for an actor. But she pulled it off so gracefully. I have full admiration towards her and her work." Koirala says that she was advised by many not to do the film, as her role has an extramarital affair. Film actress Praveena gave voice to Koirala's character. Sakhi Thomas was the costume designer for this movie.

Kannada actor Skanda Ashok (Sooraj Skanda), who had a notable debut in Malayalam through Roshan Andrews's Notebook (2006), plays the role of Edwin, Elektra's brother, who is a neurotic, and according to him, "a sort of an underdog who goes on to save the day." Biju Menon, Srikumar and Sruthi Menon also play important roles in the film. There were reports that Tamil actor Arya was also cast in the movie.

Filming
Principal production for the film started on 23 April 2010. Major portions of the filming were held at an old mansion, Kalapurackal House in Edakochi, Kerala. Cinematography was handled by Sanu George Varghese, making his debut in Malayalam. He made his feature film debut the previous year with Karthik Calling Karthik.

Release
The film was premiered at the International Film Festival of India on 24 November 2010, where the lead performances were widely praised. It was the fifth Shyamaprasad film to be screened at the IFFI, and was one of the five Malayalam films selected to be screened that year. It was screened at the International Film Festival of Kerala on 14 December, where it also received overwhelmingly positive responses. However, the film provoked protests at both these festivals for its sensuous themes. Elektra made its international premiere at the 7th Dubai International Film Festival, where it was the only South Indian film to be selected. Elektra was the second Shyamaprasad film to be screened at the DIFF (the other being Ore Kadal) and the film received rave reviews there.

In September 2010, the Ernakulam Principal Munisif Court stayed the release and distribution of the film, following an allegation by the film's original distributor Martin Sebastin that the producer Vindhyan and his Rasika Entertainment were trying to release it on their own. The film was slated for a theatrical release on 3 December 2010, but the date was postponed many times., later the film was released on 11 November 2016 after a huge delay

Accolades
 Kerala State Film Awards
 2011: Best Director: Shyamaprasad
 2011: Best Dubbing Artist: Praveena

 Official Selections
 International Film Festival of India, 2010
 International Film Festival of Kerala, 2010
 Dubai International Film Festival, 2010
 Gandhinagar International Film Festival, 2011
 Indian Film Festival 'Bollywood and Beyond', Stuttgart (Germany), 2011
 River to River Film Festival, Florence (Italy), 2011

Soundtrack
Ouseppachan was signed to do music for the film, but was replaced by Alphons Joseph, who became well known in India for the song "Aaromale". The film is Joseph's first collaboration with Shyamaprasad, who has never worked with a music director for the second time. The lyrics were penned by Rafeeq Ahmed and Shelton Pinhiro. The soundtrack includes three songs.

References

External links 

2010 films
2010s psychological drama films
2010s Malayalam-language films
Films based on works by Euripides
Films based on works by Sophocles
Films based on works by Eugene O'Neill
Films directed by Shyamaprasad
Indian psychological drama films
Films scored by Alphons Joseph
Films based on multiple works
Films set in Kerala
Films shot in Kochi
Modern adaptations of works by Sophocles
Modern adaptations of works by Euripides
Works based on The Libation Bearers
Modern adaptations of works by Aeschylus
Films based on works by Aeschylus